Shah Abu Zakaria (also Romanized as Shāh Abū Z̄akarīā, Shāh Abū Zakareyā, and Shāh Abū Zakarīā) is a village in Forg Rural District, Forg District, Darab County, Fars Province, Iran. At the 2006 census, its population was 868, in 184 families.

References 

Populated places in Darab County